The 2006 South Australian National Football League (SANFL) Grand Final saw the Woodville-West Torrens defeat the Central District Bulldogs by 76 points to claim the club's second premiership victory.

The match was played on Sunday 8 October 2006 at Football Park in front of a crowd of 25,130.

References 

SANFL Grand Finals
Sanfl Grand Final, 2006